The Springfield General Hospital, located in Springfield, Oregon, is listed on the National Register of Historic Places.
 The hospital was established in 1913.

See also
 National Register of Historic Places listings in Lane County, Oregon

References

National Register of Historic Places in Lane County, Oregon
Buildings and structures completed in 1914
1913 establishments in Oregon
Defunct hospitals in Oregon
Hospital buildings on the National Register of Historic Places in Oregon